The Mitsubishi Savrin is a minivan produced and sold in Taiwan by China Motor Corporation and Japanese automaker Mitsubishi Motors. The first generation was a locally assembled badge-engineered Chariot Grandis, while the second generation, introduced in June 2004, is actually a heavily revised facelift of the same Chariot Grandis platform.



First generation (2001–2004)

The first generation Mitsubishi Savrin in Taiwan was a locally assembled badge-engineered Chariot Grandis produced and sold by China Motor Corporation. Due to the agreement with Soueast Motors of mainland China, the same version of the rebadged Mitsubishi Chariot Grandis was rebadged as the Soueast Sovereign in mainland China.

Second generation (2004–2014)

The second generation Mitsubishi Savrin debuted in 2004 featuring redesigned front and rear fascia. The second generation Mitsubishi Savrin was sold in Taiwan only, and received another facelift in 2009 with a new grille, new tail lamps, and a redesigned rear bumper.

Annual production and sales

(source: Facts & Figures 2005, Facts & Figures 2008, Mitsubishi Motors website)

References

External links

 Mitsubishi Savrin, CMC website
 Mitsubishi Savrin specifications, CMC website

Savrin
Minivans
Front-wheel-drive vehicles
Cars of Taiwan